Danny Groulx (born June 23, 1981) is a Canadian former professional ice hockey defenceman who played in the American Hockey League and Liiga. In 2018, Groulx was inducted into the QMJHL Hall of Fame and named the head coach of Riverains du collège Charles-Lemoyne Midget AAA team.

Playing career
Groulx was drafted 11th overall by the Val-d'Or Foreurs in the 1997 QMJHL Draft. After winning the 1998 President Cup, Groulx joined the Acadie-Bathurst Titan and later the Victoriaville Tigres. At the conclusion of his major junior career, he racked up 332 points in 341 games and won three Memorial Cups. Groulx holds the distinction for most career points for a defenseman in the QMJHL.

On August 12, 2002, Groulx was signed as a free agent for the Detroit Red Wings. Groulx then played with Red Wings affiliate, the Grand Rapids Griffins of the AHL for the next three seasons before he was loaned to the Manitoba Moose for the completion of the 2004–05 season.

Groulx was invited to the Montreal Canadiens training camp on September 13, 2006. He was reassigned to the Hamilton Bulldogs of the AHL for the 2006–07 season, where he helped the Bulldogs capture the Calder Cup.

Groulx signed a one-year AHL contract with the Rockford IceHogs on September 4, 2008, and was later invited to the Chicago Blackhawks training camp on September 16, 2008. However, he was reassigned to the IceHogs for the 2008–09 season, where he posted 40 points in 80 games.

On July 16, 2009, Groulx signed a one-year contract with the San Jose Sharks. While with the Sharks American Hockey League affiliate, he was named to the AHL All-Star Classic and won the Eddie Shore Award as the AHL's best defenseman. He signed a one-year contract with the Sharks on July 2, 2012. On March 22, 2013 Groulx was assigned to the Chicago Wolves by the Sharks while Chicago defenceman Derek Joslin was assigned to the Worcester by the Vancouver Canucks as part of an AHL trade.

Groulx retired from professional hockey after the 2014–15 season which he spent in France with the Dragons de Rouen.

In 2018, Groulx was inducted into QMJHL Hall of Fame. He was later named the new head coach for the Midget AAA Collège Charles-Lemoyne Riverains.

Career statistics

References

External links

1981 births
Acadie–Bathurst Titan players
Canadian expatriate sportspeople in Finland
Canadian expatriate sportspeople in France
Canadian expatriate sportspeople in Russia
Canadian expatriate sportspeople in Belarus
Canadian ice hockey defencemen
Chicago Wolves players
Grand Rapids Griffins players
Hamilton Bulldogs (AHL) players
Kassel Huskies players
Living people
Manitoba Moose players
People from LaSalle, Quebec
Rockford IceHogs (AHL) players
Ice hockey people from Montreal
Val-d'Or Foreurs players
Victoriaville Tigres players
Worcester Sharks players
Ässät players
Canadian expatriate ice hockey players in Germany